The 1964 Redbridge Council election took place on 7 May 1964 to elect members of Redbridge London Borough Council in London, England. The whole council was up for election and the Conservative party gained control of the council.

Background
These elections were the first to the newly formed borough. Previously elections had taken place in the Municipal Borough of Dagenham, Municipal Borough of Ilford, Municipal Borough of Wanstead and Woodford and Chigwell Urban District. These boroughs and districts were joined to form the new London Borough of Redbridge by the London Government Act 1963.

A total of 192 candidates stood in the election for the 60 seats being contested across 17 wards. These included a full slate from the Conservative, Labour and Liberal parties. Other candidates included 8 Communists and 4 Residents. There were 9 four-seat wards and 8 three-seat wards.

This election had aldermen as well as directly elected councillors.  The Conservatives got 8 aldermen and Labour 2.

The Council was elected in 1964 as a "shadow authority" but did not start operations until 1 April 1965.

Election result
The results saw the Conservatives gain the new council with a majority of 30 after winning 45 of the 60 seats. Overall turnout in the election was 39.5%. This turnout included 1,023 postal votes.

Ward results

References

1964
1964 London Borough council elections